Johnson & Bell LTD is a Chicago-based law firm with approximately 100 lawyers, and offices in Chicago, Wheaton, Illinois and Crown Point, Indiana.  Founded in 1975 as William D. Maddux LTD, the firm changed the name to Johnson & Bell in 1990.  In 2016 Johnson and Bell was listed as one of the top 400 law firms in the United States by Law 360.

Johnson & Bell’s trial attorneys specializes in defense representation, and has clients throughout the Midwest and the rest of the country.  It is estimated that 90% of catastrophic cases in the Chicago area are tried with Johnson and Bell Attorneys.

The firm’s notable cases include the Beverly Hills Supper Club fire, and the Bogalusa Chemical Spill in 1995. Within the city of Chicago and the Midwest, Johnson and Bell have frequently been a part of many newsworthy cases, including the Chicago Porch Collapse, Miller Park Crane accident and numerous lawsuits against the Chicago Police.

In 2016, two former clients filed for a class-arbitration against the firm for inadequate data security. In Shore v. Johnson & Bell, the court ruled that the firm's arbitration clause prohibited a class-action, allowing only individual lawsuits.

In 2011 Johnson and Bell was named Member of the year from ALFA International.

References

External links
Official website

Companies based in Chicago
American companies established in 1975
Law firms based in Chicago